Budwan is a village of Khaga Tehsil in Fatehpur District of Uttar Pradesh State, India. It belongs to Allahabad Division. It is located 42 km east from district headquarters Fatehpur. The pin code of Budwan is 212655 and the postal head office is Khaga Town. The official languages of this village are  Hindi and English.

Schools
 Inter college Budwan
 Government Junior High school
 Government Primary School I
 Government Primary School II
 Jeevan Jyoti Vidya Mandir

References

Villages in Fatehpur district